WDLN-LP (104.9 FM) is a low power FM radio station that broadcasts from Dunnellon, Florida, United States.

References

External links
 WDLN-LP official website
 

DLN-LP
DLN
2014 establishments in Florida
Radio stations established in 2014
Marion County, Florida